Justice Nash may refer to:

George K. Nash, member of the Supreme Court Commission of Ohio
Frederick Nash, chief justice of the North Carolina Supreme Court